Zakarias Berg (born 17 July 1995) is a Greco-Roman wrestler from Sweden. He competed in the 85 kg weight division at the 2016 Olympics, but was eliminated in the first bout. Then he was the European U23 -85 kg champion, and in 2018, the senior European Championships bronze medalist.

In March 2021, he competed at the European Qualification Tournament in Budapest, Hungary hoping to qualify for the 2020 Summer Olympics in Tokyo, Japan.

References

External links
 

1995 births
Living people
Olympic wrestlers of Sweden
Wrestlers at the 2016 Summer Olympics
Swedish male sport wrestlers
European Wrestling Championships medalists
21st-century Swedish people